Ḥayyim Vidal Shabbethai ben Shabbethai Angel was Salonican rabbi and preacher. He wrote Sippur ha-Ḥayyim ('Tale of Life'), containing several funeral orations and miscellaneous homilies on the Pentateuch (Salonica, 1760).

Publications

References
 

18th-century Greek clergy
18th-century rabbis from the Ottoman Empire
Rabbis from Thessaloniki